A brush is a common tool with bristles, wire or other filaments. It generally consists of a handle or block to which filaments are affixed in either a parallel or perpendicular orientation, depending on the way the brush is to be gripped during use. The material of both the block and bristles or filaments is chosen to withstand hazards of its intended use, such as corrosive chemicals, heat or abrasion. It is used for cleaning, grooming hair, make up,   painting,  surface finishing and for many other purposes.   It is one of the most basic and versatile tools in use today, and the average household may contain several dozen varieties.

History
When houses were first inhabited, homeowners used branches taken from shrubs to sweep up dirt, hence using the first brushes. In 1859, the first brush factory in America was set up in New York.

Manufacture
A common way of setting the bristles, brush filaments, in the brush is the staple or anchor set brush in which the filament is forced with a staple by the middle into a hole with a special driver and held there by the pressure against all of the walls of the hole and the portions of the staple nailed to the bottom of the hole.  The staple can be replaced with a kind of anchor, which is a piece of rectangular profile wire that is anchored to the wall of the hole, like in most toothbrushes. Another way to attach the bristles to the surface can be found in a fused brush, in which instead of being inserted into a hole, a plastic fibre is welded to another plastic surface, giving the option to use different diameters of bristles in the same brush.

Configurations include twisted-in wire (e.g. bottle brushes), cylinders and disks (with bristles spread in one face or radially).

By function

Application of material

The action of such brushes is mostly from the sides, not the tip, contact with which releases material held by capillary action.

Finger-print forensic brush
Gilding brush
Ink brush
Makeup brush
Mascara brush
Nail-polish brush
Paintbrush (fine art or house decoration)
Pastry brush
Shaving brush
Shoe-polish brush (polish applicator)
Wall-paper brush

Combing
The action of these brushes is more akin to combing than brushing, that is they are used to straighten and untangle filaments. Certain varieties of hairbrush are however designed to brush the scalp itself free of material such as dead skin (dandruff) and to invigorate the skin of the scalp.

 Grooming brush
 Hair brush

Other
 Brush (electric), used on electrical motors
 Acid brush, described as consisting of glass threads, in 1906
Acid brush, described as consisting of horsehair held in a crimped copper tube, in 1922
Magnetic brush
 Medical sampling brush
 Brush percussion mallets
 Stippling brush (neither applies nor removes material, but merely adds pattern)

Cleaning

Brushes used for cleaning come in various sizes, ranging from even smaller than that of a toothbrush, to the standard household version accompanied by a dustpan, to 36″ deck brushes. There are brushes for cleaning tiny cracks and crevices and brushes for cleaning enormous warehouse floors. Brushes perform a multitude of cleaning tasks. For example, brushes lightly dust the tiniest figurine, they help scrub stains out of clothing and shoes, they remove grime from tires, and they remove the dirt and debris found on floors with the help of a dust pan. Specific brushes are used for diverse activities from  cleaning vegetables, as a toilet brush, washing glass, cleaning tiles, and as a mild abrasive for sanding.

References

 The Grove Encyclopedia of Materials and Techniques in Art, Gerald W. R. Ward. Oxford University Press, 2008. 
 Glossary of Brush Terms

External links

Cleaning tools
Cosmetics
Painting materials
Tools